Gadap is a neighbourhood in the Malir district of Karachi, Pakistan, that previously was a part of Gadap Town until 2011.

References

Neighbourhoods of Karachi
Gadap Town